This list of the Cenozoic life of Texas contains the various prehistoric life-forms whose fossilized remains have been reported from within the US state of Texas and are between 66 million and 10,000 years of age.

A

 †Abdounia
 †Abdounia enniskilleni
 †Abdounia recticona
 Abra
 †Abra nitens
 †Abra petropolitana
  Acanthocardia
 †Acanthocardia tuomeyi
 Acar
 †Acar aspera
 Acirsa
 †Acirsa whitneyi
 †Aclistomycter
 †Aclistomycter dunagani – type locality for species
 †Aclistomycter middletoni – type locality for species
 Acris
  †Acris crepitans
  Acteocina
 Acteon
 †Acteon idoneus
 †Acteon pomilis
 †Acteon pomilius
 †Acteon punctatus
 Adeonellopsis – tentative report
 †Adjidaumo
 †Adjidaumo minutus – or unidentified comparable form
 Admetula
 †Admetula irregularis – type locality for species
 Adrana
 †Adrana aldrichiana
 Aedes
  †Aelurodon
 †Aelurodon ferox
 †Aelurodon taxoides
  †Aepycamelus
 Agaronia
 †Agaronia bombylis
 †Agaronia media
 †Agaronia mediavia
 Agkistrodon
 †Agriocharis
 †Agriocharis anza
  †Agriochoerus
 †Agriochoerus antiquus
 †Agriotherium
 †Agriotherium schneideri
 †Agrobuccinium
 †Agrobuccinum
 †Agrobuccinum mansfieldi
 †Aguascalientia
 †Aguispira
 †Aguispira alternata
 Akera
 †Akera texana
 †Alforjas
 †Alforjas taylori – type locality for species
 Aliculastrum
 †Alilepus
 †Alilepus wilsoni
  †Allaeochelys – or unidentified comparable form
  Alligator
 †Alligator mississipiensis
 †Alligator mississippiensis
  †Alligator olseni
  †Allognathosuchus
 †Allomorone
 †Allomorone burlesonis
 †Allophaiomys
 †Allophaiomys pliocaenicus
 †Altaspiratella
 †Altaspiratella bearnensis – tentative report
 Alvania
 †Alveinus
 †Alveinus minutus
 Amaea
 †Amaea macula – type locality for species
 †Amaea texana – type locality for species
 †Amaurellina
 †Amaurellina plummeri – type locality for species
 †Amaurellina singleyi
 †Amblema
 †Amblema plicata
 †Ambystoma
 †Ambystoma tigrinum
  †Amebelodon
 †Amebelodon britti
 †Amebelodon floridanus
 †Amebelodon fricki – or unidentified comparable form
 †Ameiurus
 †Amentogerdiopollenites – type locality for genus
 †Amentogerdiopollenites oligocenensis – type locality for species
 †Amentoplexipollenites – type locality for genus
 †Amentoplexipollenites catahoulaensis – type locality for species
 Amnicola
 †Amnicola integra
  †Amphicyon
 †Amphicyon longiramus
 †Amphicyon pontoni
  †Amphimachairodus
 †Amphimachairodus coloradensis – or unidentified comparable form
  Amphiuma
 †Amphiuma antica – type locality for species
 †Amplobalanus – type locality for genus
 †Amplobalanus texensis – type locality for species
 †Ampullina
 †Ampullina dumblei
 †Ampullina recurva
 Amuletum
 †Amuletum curvocostatum
 Amusium
 †Amusium zinguli – type locality for species
 †Amynodon
 †Amynodon advenus
 †Amynodontopsis
 †Amynodontopsis bodei
 Anadara
 †Anadara vaughani
  †Anancus
 †Anancus defloccatus – type locality for species
 †Anancus orarius – type locality for species
 †Anchitheriomys
  †Anchitherium
 †Anchitherium navasotae – type locality for species
 Ancilla
 †Ancilla staminea – type locality for species
 †Ancilla staminea punctulifera
  †Angelarctocyon
 †Angelarctocyon australis – type locality for species
 †Angulithes
 †Angulithes elliotti
 †Anilioides
 †Anilioides nebraskensis – or unidentified comparable form
 †Anisaster
 †Anisaster mossomi
  †Annona
 †Annona ampla
 Anodontia
 †Anodontia reklawensis – type locality for species
 †Anomalofusus
 Anomia
 †Anomia argentaria
 †Anomia ephippioides
 †Anomia lisbonensis
  Antalis
 †Antalis minutistriatum
 †Antalis mississippiense
 †Antalis palmerae – type locality for species
 Anthonomus – tentative report
 †Antiguastrea
 †Antiguastrea cellulosa
 Antillophos
 †Antillophos multilineatum – type locality for species
 Antrozous
 †Antrozous pallidus
  †Aphelops
 †Aphelops malacorhinus
 †Aphelops megalodus
 †Aphelops mutilus
 †Aplexia
 †Aplexia hypnorum
 Aplodinotus
 †Aplodinotus grunniens
 †Apocynophyllum
 †Apocynophyllum wilcoxense
 †Apternodus
 †Apternodus iliffensis
 Aquila
  †Aquila chrysaetos
 Arca
 †Arca petropolitana
 †Archaeohippus
 †Archaeohippus blackbergi – type locality for species
 †Archaeolagus
 †Archaeolagus acaricolus – or unidentified comparable form
 †Archaeolagus buangulus – type locality for species
  †Archaeotherium
 †Archaeotherium mortoni – or unidentified comparable form
  Architectonica
 †Architectonica aldrichi – type locality for species
 †Architectonica alveatum
 †Architectonica amoena
 †Architectonica bellensis
 †Architectonica bellistriata
 †Architectonica bimixta
 †Architectonica elaborata
 †Architectonica fimbriaea – type locality for species
 †Architectonica geminicostata – type locality for species
 †Architectonica huppertzi
 †Architectonica meekana
 †Architectonica ornata
 †Architectonica phoenicea
 †Architectonica planiformis
 †Architectonica reklawensis – type locality for species
 †Architectonica texcarolina
 †Architectonica vespertina
 Arcopagia
 †Arcopagia trumani
  †Arctocyon
 †Arctocyon mumak – or unidentified comparable form
  †Arctodus
 †Arctodus simus
 †Arctonasua
 †Arctonasua gracilis – or unidentified comparable form
 †Ardynomys
 †Ardynomys occidentalis
 Argobuccinum
  Argyrotheca
 †Argyrotheca powersi
 Arius – or unidentified comparable form
 Arizona
 †Arizona elegans
 †Arretotherium
 †Arretotherium acridens
  †Artocarpus
 †Artocarpus lessigiana
  Astarte
 Asthenotoma
 †Asthenotoma eximia
 †Astrohippus
 †Astrohippus ansae – type locality for species
 †Astrohippus stockii
  Athleta
 †Athleta dalli
 †Athleta kerensensis
 †Athleta limopsis
 †Athleta limposis
 †Athleta lisbonensis
 †Athleta olssoni
 †Athleta petrosa
 †Athleta rugatus
 †Athleta stenzeli
 †Athleta symmetricus
 †Athleta texanus
 †Athleta wheelockensis
 †Athletea
 †Athletea petrosus
 Atlanta
 †Atlanta eocenica
 †Atopomys
 †Atopomys texensis
 Atractosteus
 †Atractosteus spatula
 †Atractosteus tristoechus – tentative report
 Atrina
 †Atrina cawcawensis
 †Atrina gardnerae
  †Aturia
 †Aturia brazoensis
 †Aturia laticlavia
 †Aturia triangula
 †Aturia turneri
 Atys
 †Atys atysopsis
 †Atys trapaquara
 †Aulolithomys
 †Aulolithomys bounites
 †Australocamelus
 †Australocamelus orarius – type locality for species
 †Auxontodon
 †Awateria
 †Awateria retifera

B

 †Baioconodon
 Baiomys
 †Baiomys rexroadi
 †Baiotomeus
 †Baiotomeus douglassi
 Bairdia
 †Bairdia oviformis
  Balanophyllia
 †Balanophyllia augustinensis – type locality for species
 †Balanophyllia desmophyllum
 †Balanophyllia irrorata
 †Balanophyllia ponderosa
  Balanus
 Balcis
 †Balcis exilis
 †Balcis tenua
 †Balcis wheeleri
  †Baluchicardia
 †Baluchicardia bulla
 †Baluchicardia hesperia
 †Baluchicardia moa
 †Baluchicardia whitei
 †Baluchicardia wilcoxensis
 Bankia
 †Bankia petalus – type locality for species
 †Baptemys – or unidentified comparable form
  Barbatia
 †Barbatia cuculloides
 †Barbatia deusseni
 †Barbatia ludoviciana
 †Barbatia reklawensis – type locality for species
 †Barbatia salebrosus – type locality for species
 †Barbatia uxorispalmeri
  †Barbourofelis
 †Barbourofelis whitfordi
  Bassariscus
 †Bassariscus casei
 Bathyarca
 †Bathyarca claibornica – type locality for species
 †Bathygenys
 †Bathygenys reevesi – type locality for species
 Bathytoma
 †Bathytoma nonplicata – or unidentified comparable form
 Bathytormus
 †Bathytormus flexurus
 †Batrachosauroides
 †Batrachosauroides dissimulans
 †Bauzaia – type locality for genus
 †Bauzaia lamberi – type locality for species
 †Bauzaia melrosensis
 †Bauzaia mucronata
 †Beckiasorex
 †Beckiasorex hibbardi
 Bela – report made of unidentified related form or using admittedly obsolete nomenclature
 †Bela rebeccae
 †Belosaepia
 †Belosaepia pennae – type locality for species
 †Belosaepia ungula
 †Belosaepia ungulata
 †Belosepia
 †Belosepia pennae – type locality for species
 †Bensonomys
 †Bensonomys coffeyi
 †Beretra
 †Beretra ornatula – or unidentified related form
 Bison
 †Bison alaskensis
  †Bison antiquus
  †Bison latifrons
 Bittiolum – report made of unidentified related form or using admittedly obsolete nomenclature
 †Bittiolum webbi
  Bittium
 †Bittium anita
 †Bittium estellense
 †Bittium estellensis
 †Bittium henryleai
 †Bittium ridgei – type locality for species
 †Bittium tresquatrum – type locality for species
 †Blancocamelus
 †Blancocamelus meadei
 †Blancotherium – type locality for genus
 †Blancotherium buckneri – type locality for species. Formerly known as Gnathabelodon buckneri.
 Blarina
 †Blarina brevicauda – or unidentified comparable form
  †Blastomeryx
 †Blastomeryx vigoratus – type locality for species
  †Boavus – tentative report
 †Boavus affinis
 †Bolis
 †Bolis enterogramma
 †Bombacacidites
 †Bombacacidites paulus
 †Bomburia – or unidentified comparable form
 †Bonellitia
 †Bonellitia bastropensis
 †Bonellitia parilis
  †Borealosuchus
 Bornia
 †Bornia prima
 †Bornia zapataensis
  †Borophagus
 †Borophagus diversidens
 †Borophagus hilli – type locality for species
 †Borophagus pugnator – or unidentified comparable form
 †Borophagus secundus
 †Bouromeryx
 †Bouromeryx submilleri
  †Boverisuchus
 †Boverisuchus vorax – or unidentified comparable form
 Brachidontes
 †Brachidontes alabamensis
 †Brachidontes saffordi
 †Brachidontes texanus
 Brachiodontes
 †Brachyerix – tentative report
 †Brachyerix hibbardi – type locality for species
 †Brachyhyops
 †Brachyhyops viensis
 †Brachyhyops wyomingensis
 †Brachyopsigale
 †Brachyopsigale dubius
  †Brachyrhynchocyon
 †Brachyrhynchocyon dodgei
 †Brauzaia
 †Brauzaia melrosensis
 †Brazosiella – type locality for genus
 †Brazosiella kokeni – type locality for species
 †Brazosiella moselevi
 †Brazosiella moseleyi – type locality for species
  Bregmaceros
 †Bregmaceros troelli – type locality for species
 Brissus
 †Brissus exiguus
 †Bryozoan
 Bufo
  †Bufo cognatus
 †Bufo woodhousei
 †Buisnictis
 †Buisnictis breviramus
 Bulimulus
  †Bulimulus dealbatus
 Bullia
 †Bullia altilis – type locality for species
 †Bullia ancillops
 †Bullia ellipticum – type locality for species
 †Bullia tenera
 †Bulovia
 †Bulovia weisbordi

C

 Cadulus
 †Cadulus abruptus
 †Cadulus aldrichi
 †Cadulus bisissura – type locality for species
 †Cadulus ouachitensis
 †Cadulus phoenicea
 †Cadulus subcoarcuatus
 †Cadulus turgidus
 Caecum – or unidentified comparable form
 †Caenolambda
 †Caenolambda jepseni
 Caestocorbula
 †Caestocorbula wailesiana
 †Calamagras
 †Calamagras weigeli
  †Calappilia
 †Calappilia diglypta
 †Calippus
 †Calippus cerasinus – or unidentified comparable form
 †Calippus circulus – type locality for species
 †Calippus large informal
 †Calippus martini
 †Calippus placidus
 †Calippus proplacidus
 †Calippus regulus – type locality for species
 Callianassa
 †Callianassa brazoensis
 †Callianassa wechesensis
 Callucina
 †Callucina sabelli
 †Calorhadia
 †Calorhadia bella
 †Calorhadia compsa
 †Calorhadia diminutia – type locality for species
 †Calorhadia opulenta
  Calyptraea
 †Calyptraphorus
 †Calyptraphorus aldrichi
 †Calyptraphorus popenoe
 †Calyptraphorus trinodiferus
 †Calyptraphorus velatus
  †Camelops
 †Camelops hesternus – type locality for species
 †Camelops minidokae
 †Camptoceratops
 †Camptoceratops priscus – type locality for species
 Cancellaria
 †Cancelrana
 †Cancelrana finexa
  Candona
 †Candona lactea – or unidentified comparable form
 †Candona nyensis
 Canis
  †Canis armbrusteri
  †Canis dirus
 †Canis edwardii
 †Canis latrans
 †Canis lepophagus – type locality for species
 Cantharus
 †Cantharus casteri
  †Capromeryx
 †Capromeryx furcifer
 Capulus
 †Capulus americanus
 Carapus
 †Carapus smithvillensis – type locality for species
  Carcharhinus
 †Carcharhinus gibbesi
 Cardiomya
 †Cardiomya fredsmithi – type locality for species
 
 †Caricella
 †Caricella cherokeensis
 †Caricella demissa
 †Caricella heilprini
 †Caricella stenzeli
 †Carpocyon
 †Carpocyon robustus
 †Carpolithus
 Carychium
 †Carychium exiguum
 Caryocorbula
 †Caryocorbula cappa
 †Caryocorbula coloradoensis
 †Caryocorbula deusseni
 †Caryocorbula engonatoides
 †Caryocorbula kennedyi
 †Caryocorbula marquezensis – type locality for species
  Caryophyllia
 †Caryophyllia constricta – type locality for species
 †Caryophyllia mediavia – type locality for species
 †Caryophyllia texana – type locality for species
 Castor
  †Castor canadensis
  Catagonus
 †Caveola
 †Caveola ostium – type locality for species
 Celleporaria
 †Celleporaria granulosa
 Celtis
 †Centetodon
 †Centetodon chadronensis
 †Centetodon pulcher
 Centropomus – tentative report
 Ceratobulimina
 †Ceratobulimina eximia
  †Ceratogaulus
 †Ceratogaulus anecdotus – or unidentified comparable form
 †Cerdocyon
 †Cerdocyon texanus – type locality for species
 Cerithiella
 †Cerithiella terebropsis
 †Cerithioderma
 †Cerithioderma primum
 Cerithiopsis
 Cerithium – tentative report
 Chaetodipus
 †Chaetodipus hispidus
 Chama
 †Chama taylorensis – type locality for species
  Charina
 †Charina prebottae
 †Charophyte
 †Charophyte oogonia
  †Chasmaporthetes
 †Chasmaporthetes ossifragus
 †Chiromyoides
 †Chiromyoides minor – or unidentified comparable form
 †Chiromyoides potior
 Chironomus
 †Chironomus kirklandi – type locality for species
 Chlamys
 †Chlamys beverlyi
 †Chlamys burlesonensis
 †Chriacus
 †Chriacus baldwini
 †Cimolodon
 †Cimomia
 †Cimomia vaughani – type locality for species
 Cirsotrema
 †Cirsotrema nassulum
  Cissus
 †Cissus pulcherrima
 †Claibornichthys
 †Claibornichthys troelli – type locality for species
  Clavilithes
 †Clavilithes acus – type locality for species
 †Clavilithes chamberlaini
 †Clavilithes kennedyanus
 †Clavilithes parvetorbis – type locality for species
 †Clavilithes penrosei
 †Clavilithes regexus
 †Clavilithes texanus
 Clavus – tentative report
 †Clavus dipta
 †Cleonidius
 †Cleonidius channingensis – type locality for species
 †Cleonidius ritablancaensis – type locality for species
 Clithrocytheridea
 †Clithrocytheridea garretti
 Closia
 †Closia semen
 †Closia semenoides
 Clypeaster
 †Clypeaster oxybaphon – or unidentified comparable form
 †Clypeaster rogersi
 †Cochlefusia
 †Cochlefusia serrae – type locality for species
  Cochlespira
 †Cochlespira bastropensis
 †Cochlespira bella
 †Cochlespira columbaria
 †Cochlespira engonata
 †Cochlespira greggi – tentative report
 †Cochlespirella
 †Cochlespirella nana
 †Cochlespiropsis
 †Cochlespiropsis engonata
 Cochliolepis
 †Cochliolepis palaeocenica – type locality for species
 Cochlodesma
 †Cochlodesma howei – or unidentified comparable form
 †Cochlodesma ovalis – type locality for species
 †Colodon
 †Colodon stovalli
 Coluber
  †Coluber constrictor
 Colubraria
 †Colubraria cedri
 Columbella – report made of unidentified related form or using admittedly obsolete nomenclature
 †Columbella punctostriata
 †Colwellia
 †Colwellia bilineata – type locality for species
  †Combretum
 †Combretum bartonii
 Cominella – or unidentified comparable form
 †Cominella pachecoi
 Conomitra
 †Conomitra texana
 Conopeum
 †Conopeum damicornis
 †Contracuparius – type locality for genus
 †Contracuparius huntsvillensis – type locality for species
 †Contracuparius robustus – type locality for species
  Conus
 †Conus sauridens – type locality for species
 †Conus smithvillensis
 †Copemys
 †Coptostoma
 †Coptostoma rameum
 †Coptostoma ulmulum
 Corbicula
 †Corbicula texana
  Corbula
 †Corbula alabamiensis
 †Corbula augustae
 †Corbula cappa
 †Corbula coloradoensis
 †Corbula kennedyi
 †Corbula marquezensis – type locality for species
 †Corbula milium
 †Corbula texana – type locality for species
  †Cormohipparion
 †Cormohipparion fricki – type locality for species
 †Cormohipparion goorisi
 †Cormohipparion ingenuum – type locality for species
 †Cormohipparion skinneri – type locality for species
 †Cornulina
 †Cornulina armigera
 †Cornulina dalli
 †Cornulina minax – type locality for species
 †Coronia
 †Coronia alternata
 †Coronia anacona
 †Coronia childreni
 †Coronia genitiva
 †Coronia margaritosa
 †Coronia mediavia
 †Coronia nodoidea
 †Coronia nucleata
 †Coronia ostrarupis
 †Coronia sublerchi
 †Coronia taylori – type locality for species
 †Corvina
 †Corvina intermedia
 Corvus
  †Corvus brachyrhynchos
  †Coryphodon
 †Coryphodon armatus
  †Cranioceras
 †Cranioceras teres – type locality for species
 Crassatella
 †Crassatella antestriata
 †Crassatella gabbi
 †Crassatella ioannes
 †Crassatella texalta
 †Crassatella texana
 †Crassatella trapaquara
 Crassinella
 †Crassinella aldrichi
 †Crassinella minor
 †Crassinella pteleina
  Crassostrea
 †Crassostrea amichel
 †Crassostrea contracta
 †Crassostrea frionis
 Cratogeomys
 †Cratogeomys castanops
 Crenella
 †Crenella margaritacea
 †Crenodonta
 †Crenodonta perplicata
 †Creonella
 Creseis
 †Cristellaria
 †Cristellaria orelliana
 †Cristellaria rotulata
 †Cristellaria torrida
 Crotalus
  †Crotalus atrox
  †Crotalus horridus
 Crotaphytus
  †Crotaphytus collaris
 †Crotaphytus reticulatus
 †Cryptochorda
 †Cryptochorda eureia
 †Cryptochorda stenostoma
 Cryptotis
  †Cryptotis parva
 Ctenoides
 †Ctenoides bastropensis
 †Cubitostrea
 †Cubitostrea divaricata
 †Cubitostrea lisbonensis
 †Cubitostrea petropolitana
 †Cubitostrea sanctiaugustini
 †Cubitostrea sellaeformis
 †Cubitostrea smithvillensis
  Cucullaea
 †Cucullaea kaufmanensis
 †Cucullaea macrodonta
 †Cucullaea saffordi
 †Cucullaea texana
  Culex
 Cuna
 †Cuneocorbula
 †Cuneocorbula subengonata
 †Cupanites
 †Cupanites formosus
 †Cupidinimus
 Cuspidaria
 †Cuspidaria grandis
  †Cuvieronius
  Cyclammina
 Cyclostremiscus
 †Cyclostremiscus axacuus
 †Cyclostremiscus dalli
 †Cyclostremiscus exacuus
 †Cyclostremiscus sylvaerupis
 Cylichna
 †Cylichna bicarinata – type locality for species
 †Cylindracanthus
 †Cylindrodon
 Cyllene – or unidentified comparable form
 †Cyllene bellana
  †Cynarctoides
 †Cynarctoides whistleri
 †Cynarctus
 †Cynarctus crucidens
 Cynomys
  †Cynomys ludovicianus
 †Cynomys spenceri
  Cypraea
 Cypraedia
 †Cypraedia subcancellata – type locality for species
 †Cypraeorbis
 †Cypraeorbis bulbus – type locality for species
 Cypridopsis
 †Cypridopsis vidua
 Cythara
 †Cythara schotti
 Cythere
 †Cythere claiborniana
 †Cythere evergreenica
 †Cythere leeana
 †Cythere orelliana
 †Cythere texana
 †Cythereis
 †Cythereis bursilloides
 †Cythereis davidwhitei
 †Cythereis elmana
 †Cythereis elongata – type locality for species
 †Cythereis fragillissima – type locality for species
 †Cythereis hilgardi
 †Cythereis linospinosa – type locality for species
 †Cythereis montgomeryensis
 †Cythereis quinquespinosa – type locality for species
 †Cythereis reklawensis – type locality for species
 †Cythereis russelli
 †Cythereis sinuata – type locality for species
 †Cythereis smithvillensis – type locality for species
 †Cythereis spinosa – type locality for species
 †Cythereis splendens – type locality for species
 †Cythereis uptonensis – type locality for species
 †Cythereis washburni – type locality for species
 Cytherella
 †Cytherella fimbricinctus – type locality for species
 †Cytherella texana
 Cytheridea
 †Cytheridea compressa – type locality for species
 †Cytheridea habropapillosa – type locality for species
 †Cytheridea mulleri
 †Cytheridea subovata – type locality for species
 †Cytheridea subpyriformis – type locality for species
 Cytheropteron
 †Cytheropteron minutum – type locality for species
 †Cytheropteron virgineum

D

 †Dakotaophis
 †Dakotaophis greeni
 †Daphoenictis
  †Daphoenodon
 †Daphoenodon notionastes
  †Daphoenus
 †Daphoenus lambei – or unidentified comparable form
 Dasyatis
 Dasypus
  †Dasypus bellus
 †Delahomeryx
 †Delahomeryx browni – type locality for species
 Dentalium
 †Dentalium mediaviense
 †Dentalium palmerae – type locality for species
 †Dentalium thalloides – or unidentified related form
 Dermatemys
 †Desmatippus
 †Desmatippus texanus
 †Diablomomys – type locality for genus
 †Diablomomys dalquesti – type locality for species
 †Diaphyodus
 †Diaphyodus wilsoni – type locality for species
 †Dibelodon
 †Dibelodon praecursor
  †Diceratherium
 †Diceratherium annectens
 †Diceratherium armatum
 Didelphis
 †Didelphis marsupialis
 †Dillenites
 †Dillenites microdentatus
 †Dillenites texensis
  †Dinofelis
 †Dinofelis palaeoonca
  †Dinohippus
 †Dinohippus interpolatus – type locality for species
 †Dinohippus mexicanus – or unidentified comparable form
  †Dinohyus
 †Dinohyus hollandi
 Diplodonta
 †Diplodonta anterproductus
 †Diplodonta petropolitana
 †Diplodonta satex
 Diplotaxis – or unidentified comparable form
 Dipodomys
 †Dipodomys merriami
 †Dipodomys ordii
 †Dipodomys pattersoni – type locality for species
 †Dipodomys spectabilis
 †Dirocerithium
 †Dirocerithium wechesense
 †Discotrochus
 †Discotrochus orbignianus
 †Discradisca
 †Discradisca littigensis
 Disonycha
 †Dolicholatirus
 †Dolicholatirus harrisi
 †Dolicholatirus leaensis
 †Dolicholatirus obtusus
 †Dolicholatirus singleyi
 †Domenginella
 †Domenginella ridgei – type locality for species
 †Domingella
 †Domingella ridgei – type locality for species
 Dorsanum
 †Dorsanum – type locality for species informal
 †Dorsanum scalatum
 †Drepanomeryx
 †Drepanomeryx falciformis
 †Dryophyllum
 †Dryophyllum tennesseensee
  †Duchesneodus
 †Duchesneodus uintensis

E

 †Eburneopecten
 †Eburneopecten scintillatus
  †Echmatemys
 †Ectypodus
 †Ectypodus musculus
 †Edaphocyon
 †Edaphocyon pointblankensis – type locality for species
 †Ekokenia
 †Ekokenia eporrecta
 Elaphe
 †Elaphe guttata
 †Elaphe nebraskensis
 †Elaphe obsoleta
  Eleutherodactylus
 †Eleutherodactylus augusti
 †Ellipsechinus
 †Ellipsechinus prisca
  †Ellisella
  Emarginula – or unidentified comparable form
 Endochironomus
 Endopachys
 †Endopachys maclurii
 Engelhardia
 †Engelhardia trinitiensis – type locality for species
 †Eoancilla
 †Eoancilla hordea – type locality for species
 †Eocypraea
 †Eocypraea estellensis
 †Eocythara – type locality for genus
 †Eocythara lineata – type locality for species
 †Eocythara texanum – type locality for species
 †Eodichroma – type locality for genus
 †Eodichroma mirifica – type locality for species
 †Eodrilla
 †Eodrilla texana
 †Eodrillia
 †Eodrillia texana
 †Eodrillia texanopsis
 †Eomellivora
 †Eopleurotoma
 †Eopleurotoma bimoniata
 †Eopleurotoma lisboncola
 †Eopleurotoma nodocarinata
 †Eosolea – type locality for genus
 †Eosolea texana – type locality for species
 †Eosurcula
 †Eosurcula moorei – type locality for species
 †Eosurcula superpons
 †Eotylopus
 †Eotylopus reedi – or unidentified comparable form
  Epicauta
  †Epicyon
 †Epicyon haydeni
 †Epicyon saevus
  †Epihippus
 †Epihippus gracilis
 Epilucina
 Episcynia
 †Episcynia bastropensis
 Episiphon
 †Episiphon gracilis – type locality for species
 Epitonium
 †Epitonium cookii
 †Epitonium dolosum
 †Epitonium multiliniferum
 †Epitriplopus
 Eponides
 †Eponides patelliformis
 †Eponides texana
 Eptesicus
 †Eptesicus fuscus
 †Eptesicus hemphillensis – type locality for species
 Equus
 †Equus alaskae – or unidentified comparable form
 †Equus complicatus
  †Equus conversidens
 †Equus francisci – type locality for species
 †Equus giganteus
 †Equus idahoensis
 †Equus midlandensis
  †Equus scotti – type locality for species
 †Equus semiplicatus
  †Equus simplicidens
 Erethizon
 †Erethizon dorsatum
 †Eucheilodon
 †Eucheilodon reticulata
  †Eucyon
 †Eucyon davisi
 Eucytherura
 †Eucytherura claibornensis – type locality for species
 Eulima
 †Eulima extremis
 †Eulima tenaxa
  Eumeces
 †Eumeces fasciatus
 †Eumeces miobsoletus – type locality for species
 †Eumeces obsoletus
 †Euonymus
 †Euonymus glanduliferus
 Eupleura
 †Eupleura morula
 †Euryochetus
 †Euryochetus punctatum – type locality for species
 Eurytellina
 †Eurytellina milamensis – type locality for species
 †Eurytellina mooreana
 †Eurytellina papyria
  Euspira
 †Euspira aldrichi
 †Euspira jacksonensis
 †Euspira marylandica
 †Euspira perspecta
 †Eutrephoceras
 †Eutrephoceras reesidei
 †Eutypomys
 †Eutypomys inexpectatus – type locality for species
 †Exilia
 †Exilia pergracilis

F

 Falsifusus
 †Falsifusus apicalis
 †Falsifusus bastropensis
 †Falsifusus harrisi
 †Falsifusus houstonensis
 †Falsifusus ludlovicianus
 †Falsifusus ottonis
 †Falsifusus perobliquus
 †Falsifusus tobar
  Fasciolaria – tentative report
 †Fasciolaria plummeri
 Felis
 †Felis lacustris
 †Felis rexroadensis
 Fibularia
 †Fibularia texana
 †Ficopsis
 †Ficopsis nucleoides – type locality for species
 †Ficopsis penita
 †Ficopsis texana
  Ficus
 †Ficus berryi
 †Ficus mississippiensis
 †Fimbriatella
 †Fimbriatella iugum – type locality for species
 Flabellum
 †Flabellum concoideum
 †Flabellum conodeum – tentative report
 †Flabellum conoideum – type locality for species
 †Flabellum cuneiforme
 †Flabellum johnsonae
 †Floridachoerus – tentative report
 †Floridachoerus olseni
 †Floridatragulus
 †Floridatragulus hesperus
 †Floridatragulus nanus
 †Floridatragulus texanus
  Formica
 †Formica eoptera – type locality for species
 Fossaria
 †Fossaria dalli
 †Fossaria obrussa
 Fulgurofusus
 †Fulgurofusus quercollis
  †Fusconaia
 †Fusconaia undulata – or unidentified comparable form
 Fusimitra
 †Fusimitra adamsi
 †Fusimitra millingtoni
 †Fusimitra perexilis
 †Fusimitra polita
  Fusinus
 †Fusinus claibornica – type locality for species
 †Fusoficula
 †Fusoficula angelinensis
 Fustiaria
 †Fustiaria aciculata – type locality for species

G

 Gadila
 †Gadila palmerae
 Galeocerdo
 †Galeocerdo eaglesomei
 †Galeocerdo latidens
  Galeodea
 †Galeodea dubia
 †Galeodea koureos
 †Galeodea petersoni
 †Galeodea planotecta
 Gastrocopta
  †Gastrocopta armifera
 †Gastrocopta contracta
 †Gastrocopta cristata
 †Gastrocopta pellicuda
 †Gastrocopta pellucida
 †Gastrocopta pentodon
 †Gastrocopta procera
 †Gastrocopta tappaniana
  †Gavialosuchus
 Gegania
 †Gegania antiquata
 †Gelastops
 †Genartina – type locality for genus
 †Genartina texana – type locality for species
 Geochelone
 Geomys
 †Geomys bursarius
 †Geomys minor
 †Geomys tobinensis
 †Gigantocamelus
 †Gigantocamelus spatulus
 †Gilbertina
 †Gilbertina texana
  †Glossotherium
 †Glossotherium chapadmalense
 †Glottidia
 †Glottidia antarctica – type locality for species
  Glycymeris
 †Glycymeris petropolitana
 †Glyphalini
 †Glyphalini identata
 Glyptoactis
 †Glyptoactis alticostata
 †Glyptoactis coloradonis
 †Glyptoactis crenaea
 †Glyptoactis eoa
 †Glyptoactis linguinodifera – type locality for species
 †Glyptoactis milamensis – type locality for species
 †Glyptoactis trapaquara
  †Glyptodon
 †Glyptodon petaliferus
  †Glyptotherium
 †Glyptotherium arizonae
 †Glyptotherium texanum
 †Glyptotoma
 †Glyptotoma conradiana
 †Glyptotoma crassiplicata
 Glyptozaria
 †Glyptozaria americanae – type locality for species
 †Gnathabelodon – only reported species reclassified new genus Blancotherium.
 †Gnathabelodon buckneri – type locality for species. Later reclassified as Blancotherium buckneri
 †Gomphopages
 †Gomphopages turneri
  †Gomphotherium
 †Gomphotherium gratum – type locality for species
 †Gomphotherium obscurum
 †Goniobasis
 †Goniobasis miocaenica
 Gopherus – type locality for genus
 †Gopherus canyonensis – type locality for species
 †Gopherus hexagonatus
 †Gopherus polyphemus – type locality for species
 †Granocardium
 Graptemys
  †Graptemys geographica
 Gregariella
 †Gregariella ridgei – type locality for species
 †Gregorymys
 †Gregorymys riograndensis – type locality for species
 †Gulfoceras
 †Gulfoceras westfalli – type locality for species
  †Gustafsonia
 †Gustafsonia cognita
 Guttulina
 †Guttulina problema
 Gyraulus
 †Gyraulus circumstriatus
 †Gyraulus parvus

H

 †Hadrianus
 †Haimesiastraea
 †Haimesiastraea conferta
 †Haplaletes
 †Haplaletes disceptatrix
 †Haploconus
 †Haploconus angustus
 Haplocytheridea
 †Haplocytheridea habropapillosa
 †Haplocytheridea lisbonensis
 †Haplocytheridea stenzeli
  †Haplohippus
 †Haplohippus texanus
 Harpa
  †Harpactocarcinus
 †Harpactocarcinus americanus
 †Harpactocarcinus rathbunnae
  †Harpagolestes
 †Harpagolestes uintensis
 †Harrisianella
 †Harrisianella plicifera
  Hastula
 †Hastula ampulla – type locality for species
 †Hastula houstonia
 †Hastula longifera – type locality for species
 †Hastula milamensis – type locality for species
 †Hastula sabina
 †Hastula venusta
 Haustator
 †Haustator infans
 †Haustator rina
 Hawaiia
 †Hawaiia minuscula
 †Hawiia
 †Hawiia minuscula
  †Hayoceros
 †Hayoceros falkenbachi
 Helicina
 †Helicina orbiculata
 Helicodiscus
 †Helicodiscus paralellus
 †Helicodiscus parallelus
 †Helicodiscus singleyanus
 †Heliconoides
 †Heliconoides auriformis – type locality for species
 Helisoma
 †Helisoma anceps
 †Helisoma trivolvis
  Heloderma
 †Heloderma texana – type locality for species
 †Helohyus
 †Helohyus lentus – or unidentified comparable form
  †Hemiauchenia
 †Hemiauchenia macrocephala
 †Hemipsalodon
 †Hemipsalodon viejaensis – type locality for species
 †Hendryomeryx
 †Hendryomeryx defordi
 †Hendryomeryx wilsoni
 †Heptacodon
 †Heptacodon yeguaensis – type locality for species
 †Hercoglossa
 †Hercoglossa – type locality for species A informal
 †Hercoglossa gardnerae
 †Hercoglossa splendens
 †Hercoglossa ulrichi
  †Herpetotherium
 †Hesperhys – tentative report
 †Hesperiturris
 †Hesperiturris monilis – type locality for species
 †Hesperiturris nodocarinatus – type locality for species
 †Hesperoscalops
 †Hesperoscalops blancoensis
 †Hesperoscalops rexroadi
 †Hesperoscalops ruficervus
 †Hesperotestudo
 †Hesperotestudo crassiscutata – type locality for species
 †Hesperotestudo johnstoni – type locality for species
 †Hesperotestudo turgida – type locality for species
 †Hesperotestudo wilsoni
 †Hessolestes
 †Heteraletes
 †Heteraletes leotanus – or unidentified comparable form
 Heterodon
  †Heterodon nasicus – or unidentified comparable form
 †Heterodon platyrhinos – or unidentified comparable form
 †Heteromeryx
 †Heteromeryx dispar
 Hexaplex
 †Hexaplex colei
 †Hexaplex eoa – type locality for species
 †Hexaplex silvaticus
 †Hexaplex texanus – type locality for species
 †Hexaplex vanuxemi
 †Hexobelomeryx – tentative report
  †Hipparion
 †Hipparion brevidontus
 †Hipparion shirleyae
 †Hipparion tehonense
 †Hippidion
 Hippodamia
 †Hippodamia convergens – tentative report
 Hipponix
 †Hipponix pygmaeus
  †Hippotherium
 Holbrookia
  †Holmesina
 †Holmesina septentrionalis
  †Homotherium
 †Homotherium johnstoni
 †Homotherium serum
  †Hyaenodon
 †Hyaenodon crucians
 †Hyaenodon horridus – or unidentified comparable form
 †Hyaenodon montanus
 †Hyaenodon raineyi
 †Hyaenodon vetus – or unidentified comparable form
 Hyla
 †Hyla holmani – type locality for species
 †Hyla miocenica – type locality for species
 †Hylomeryx
 †Hyopsodus
 †Hyopsodus paulus
 †Hyopsodus uintensis – or unidentified comparable form
 †Hyopsodus wortmani – or unidentified comparable form
 Hyotissa
 †Hyotissa offemanae – type locality for species
 †Hyotissa offmanna
 †Hypertragulus
 †Hypertragulus heikeni – or unidentified comparable form
  †Hypohippus
 †Hypohippus affinis – type locality for species
  †Hypolagus
 †Hypolagus edensis
 †Hypolagus fontinalis
 †Hypolagus furlongi
 †Hypolagus gidleyi
 †Hypolagus regalis
 †Hypolagus ringoldensis
 †Hypolagus vetus
 †Hyrachyus
 †Hyrachyus modestus – or unidentified comparable form
 †Hyracodon
 †Hyracodon medius
 †Hyracodon petersoni
  †Hyracotherium
 †Hyracotherium vasacciense

I

 †Icacorea
 †Icacorea prepaniculata
 Ictalurus
 †Ictalurus punctatus
 †Ictiobus
 †Ignacius
 †Ignacius frugivorus
  †Indarctos
 †Infracoronia
 †Infracoronia ludoviciana
 †Inga
 †Inga laurinafolia
 †Ischnognathus
 †Ischnognathus savagei – type locality for species
 †Ischyrocyon
 †Ischyrocyon gidleyi – type locality for species
  †Ischyromys
 †Ischyromys blacki – type locality for species
 Isognomon

J

 †Jefitchia – type locality for genus
 †Jefitchia copelandi – type locality for species
 †Jepsenella
 †Jimomys
 †Jimomys labaughi
  Juglans
 †Juglans bastropensis
 Jupiteria
 †Jupiteria smirna

K

  †Kalobatippus
 †Kalobatippus australis
 †Kansasimys
 †Kansasimys dubius
 †Kapalmerella
 †Kapalmerella arenicola
 †Kapalmerella dumblei
 †Kapalmerella mortoni
 †Kapalmerella pleboides
 Katherinella
 †Katherinella smithvillensis
 †Katherinella texitrina
 †Katherinella trinitatis
 Kelliella
 †Kelliella aldrichi
 †Kelliella evansi
 Kellyella
 †Kellyella texana – type locality for species
 Kinosternon
  †Kinosternon flavescens
  Kuphus

L

 †Lacinia
 †Lacinia alveata
 †Lacunaria
 †Lacunaria lithae
 †Laevibuccinum
 †Laevibuccinum constrictum
 †Laevibuccinum lineatum
 †Lambdoceras
 †Lambdoceras trinitiensis
 †Lambertocyon
 †Lambertocyon eximius
  Lampropeltis
 †Lampropeltis getulus
 †Lampropeltis triangulum
 †Langiopollis
 †Langiopollis eocaenica
 †Lapparia
 †Lapparia crassa
 †Lapparia dumosa
 †Lapparia elongata
 †Lapparia mooreana
 †Lapparia nuda
 †Laredochoerus – type locality for genus
 †Laredochoerus edwardsi – type locality for species
 †Laredomys
 †Laredomys riograndensis – type locality for species
 Lasionycteris
  †Lasionycteris noctivagans
 Lasiurus
  †Lasiurus borealis
  Latirus
 †Latirus humilior
 †Latirus moorei
 †Latirus ostrarupis
 †Latirus sexcostatus
 †Latirus stephensoni
 †Latirus traceyi – type locality for species
 †Latrius
 †Latrius traceyi – type locality for species
 †Ledina
 †Ledina smirna
 †Ledina turgeo – type locality for species
  †Leea
 Lepisosteus
 †Lepisosteus spatula – or unidentified comparable form
 Lepomis
 †Lepomis cyanellus – or unidentified comparable form
 †Leptarctus
 †Leptarctus supremus – type locality for species
  †Leptictis
 †Leptictis douglassi – type locality for species
 †Leptictis wilsoni – type locality for species
  †Leptocyon
 †Leptocyon vafer
 †Leptoreodon
 †Leptoreodon edwardsi
 †Leptoreodon leptolophus
 †Leptoreodon major
 †Leptoreodon marshi
 †Leptoreodon pusillus
 †Leptosurcula
 †Leptosurcula beadata
 †Leptosurcula carinata – type locality for species
 †Leptotomus
 Lepus
  †Lepus californicus
 †Levifusus
 †Levifusus dalei – tentative report
 †Levifusus hubbardi
 †Levifusus identus
 †Levifusus irrasus
 †Levifusus lithae
 †Levifusus mortoniopsis
 †Levifusus pagodiformis
 †Levifusus serrae – type locality for species
 †Levifusus supraplanus
 †Levifusus trabeatus
 Limacina
 †Limacina stenzeli – type locality for species
 †Limacina taylori
  Limaria
 †Limaria petropolitana
 †Limaria smithvillensis
 †Limnenetes
 †Limnenetes platyceps – or unidentified comparable form
 Limopsis
 †Limopsis quihi
 †Limopsis radiata
 †Linthia
 †Linthia alabamensis
 †Lirodiscus
 †Lirodiscus jacksonensis
 †Lirodiscus smithvillensis
 †Lirofusus
 †Lirofusus subtenuis
  Lithophaga
 †Lithophysema
 †Lithophysema grande
 Litiopa
 †Litiopa texana – type locality for species
 †Litorhadia
 †Litorhadia aldrichiana
 †Litorhadia bastropensis
 †Litorhadia compsa
 †Litorhadia evanescentior
 †Litorhadia milamensis – type locality for species
 †Litorhadia petropolitana
 †Litorhadia undulata – type locality for species
 †Litorhadia valdefragilis – type locality for species
 †Litoyoderimys
 †Litoyoderimys lustrorum
  Littorina
 †Littorina eofasciata – type locality for species
 †Longirostromeryx
 †Longirostromeryx clarendonensis – type locality for species
 †Longirostromeryx wellsi
  Lovenia
 †Lovenia alabamensis
 Loxoconcha
 †Loxoconcha delicata
 Lucina
 †Lucina subcurta
 Lucinisca
 Lunatia – report made of unidentified related form or using admittedly obsolete nomenclature
 †Lunatia moorei
  Lunularia – tentative report
 Lunulites
 †Lunulites bouei
 †Lunulites ligulata
 †Lunulites truncata
 †Lygodiumsporites
 †Lygodiumsporites adriennis
  Lymnaea
 †Lymnaea caperata
 †Lymnaea dalli
 †Lymnaea modicella
 †Lymnaea obrussa
 Lynx
 †Lynx proterolyncis
  †Lynx rufus
 Lyria
 †Lyrosurcula
 †Lyrosurcula gibbera
 †Lyrosurcula vaughani
 Lytta

M

  †Machairodus
 †Machairodus catocopis
 Macrocallista
 †Macrocallista triangulata – type locality for species
 †Macrotarsius
 †Macrotarsius jepseni – or unidentified comparable form
 Mactra
 Madracis
 †Madracis gregorioi
 †Madracis herricki – type locality for species
 †Madracis johnsoni – type locality for species
  Madrepora
 †Madrepora natchitochensis
  Magnolia
 †Magnolia leei
 †Mahgarita
 †Mahgarita stevensi – type locality for species
 †Malaquiferus – tentative report
 †Mammut
  †Mammut americanum
 †Mammuthus
  †Mammuthus columbi
 †Mammuthus hayi
 Marginella
 †Marginella carnea
 †Marginella constrictoides
 Marmota
 †Marmota flaviventris
 †Marshochoerus
 †Marshochoerus socialis
 Martes
 Martesia
 †Martesia laredoensis
 †Martesia texana
 †Martinogale
 †Martinogale chisoensis
 †Mathilda
 †Mathilda claibornensis
 †Mathilda cribraea – type locality for species
 †Mathilda iugum – type locality for species
 †Mathilda retisculpta
 †Mauricia
 †Mauricia houstonia
 †Mauricia leonia
 †Mazzalina
 †Mazzalina conica – type locality for species
 †Mazzalina plena
  †Megalictis – tentative report
 †Megalonyx
 †Megalonyx jeffersonii – or unidentified comparable form
 †Megalonyx leptostomus
  †Megatherium
 †Megatherium mirabite
  †Megatylopus
 †Megatylopus matthewi – type locality for species
 †Megatylopus primaevus
 Melanella
 †Melanella extremis – or unidentified related form
 †Melanella minutissima – type locality for species
 †Melanella notata – or unidentified comparable form
 †Melanella wheeleri
 †Meliakrouniomys
 †Meliakrouniomys wilsoni – type locality for species
 Meliosma
 †Meliosma berryi – type locality for species
 †Menetus
 †Menetus dilataus
  †Menoceras
 †Menoceras barbouri
 †Menops
 †Menops bakeri
 Mephitis
 †Mephitis mephitis
 Meretrix
 †Meretrix nuttelliopsis
  †Merychippus
 †Merychippus gunteri
 †Merychippus insignis – or unidentified comparable form
 †Merychippus sejunctus
 †Merychippus shirleyae
 †Merychyus
 †Merychyus calaminthus – or unidentified comparable form
 †Merychyus novomexicanus
  †Merycoidodon
 †Merycoidodon culbertsoni
 †Merycoidodon presidioensis
 Mesalia
 †Mesalia alabamiensis
 †Mesalia allentonensis
 †Mesalia biplicata
 †Mesalia claibornensis
 †Mesalia mavericki
 †Mescalerolemur – type locality for genus
 †Mescalerolemur horneri – type locality for species
 Mesodesma
 †Mesodesma singleyi
 †Mesodma
 †Mesodma pygmaea – or unidentified comparable form
 †Mesodma thompsoni
  †Mesohippus
 †Mesohippus texanus
 †Mesomphix
 †Metalopex
 †Metalopex bakeri – type locality for species
  †Metamynodon
 †Metamynodon chadronensis
 †Metamynodon mckinneyi – type locality for species
 Metula
 †Metula brazosensis
 †Metula elongatoides – type locality for species
 †Metula gracilis
 †Metula reticulata – type locality for species
 †Michela
 †Michela trabeatoides – type locality for species
 †Michenia
 †Michenia exilis – type locality for species
  Microdrillia
 †Microdrillia aldrichella
 †Microdrillia aldrichiella
 †Microdrillia elongatula
 †Microdrillia harrisi
 †Microdrillia infans
 †Microdrillia laeviplicata
 †Microdrillia parthenoides
 †Microdrillia robustula – or unidentified related form
 †Microdrillia rostratula
 †Microdrillia solidula
 †Microeutypomys
 †Microeutypomys karenae – type locality for species
 †Microparamys
 †Microparamys minutus
 †Microparamys perfossus
  Micropterus
 †Microsurcula
 †Microsurcula iuventae – type locality for species
 †Microsyops
 †Microsyops annectens
 †Microtomarctus
 †Microtomarctus conferta
 Microtus
 †Microtus australis
 †Microtus llanensis
 †Microtus meadensis
 †Microtus mexicanus
 †Microtus paroperarius
  †Microtus pennsylvanicus
 †Microtus pinetorum
 Micrurus
  †Micrurus fulvius
 Mictomys
 †Mictomys meltoni
 Miltha
 †Miltha albaripus
 †Mimetodon
 †Mimetodon silberlingi
 †Minippus
 †Minippus index
 †Mioclaenus
 †Mioclaenus opisthacus
 †Miocoluber – type locality for genus
 †Miocoluber dalquesti – type locality for species
 †Miocyon
 †Miocyon scotti – or unidentified comparable form
 †Miocyon vallisrubrae
  †Miohippus
 †Miolabis
 †Mionictis
  †Miracinonyx
 †Miracinonyx inexpectatus – or unidentified comparable form
 †Miracinonyx studeri
 Mitrella
 †Mitrella bastropensis
 †Mitrella nuttalli – type locality for species
 †Mitrella texana – type locality for species
 †Mixodectes
 †Mixodectes malaris
 Mnestia
 †Mnestia confusa – type locality for species
 †Mnestia dekayi
 †Mnestia ovata – type locality for species
 †Mnestia rotunda – type locality for species
 Modiolus – tentative report
 †Monoptygma
 †Monoptygma crassiplicum
 Montastraea
 †Montastraea intermedia
  †Moropus
 †Moropus oregonensis – or unidentified comparable form
 †Morrillia
 †Morrillia barbouri
 Murex
 †Murex fusates
 †Murex mansfieldi
 Mustela
 †Mustela rexroadensis
  Myctophum
 †Myctophum americanum – type locality for species
 Myliobatis
  †Mylohyus
 †Mylohyus fossilis
 Myotis
 †Myotis lucifugus
 †Myotis velifer
 Myrtea
 †Myrtea curta
 †Myrtea mesakta
 †Myrtea uhleri – or unidentified comparable form
 Mytilus
 †Mytonomys
 †Mytonomys coelumensis
 †Mytonomys robustus
 Myzinum – or unidentified comparable form

N

  †Nannippus
 †Nannippus aztecus
 †Nannippus beckensis – type locality for species
 †Nannippus lenticularis
 †Nannippus peninsulatus
 †Nannodectes
 †Nannodectes gidleyi – or unidentified related form
 †Nanotragulus
 †Nanotragulus ordinatus
 Narona
 †Narona greggi
  Nassarius
 †Nassarius emoryi
 †Nassarius exilis
 †Nassarius nodosa – type locality for species
 †Nassarius seguinensis – type locality for species
  Nasua
 †Nasua pronarica – type locality for species
  Natica
 †Natica aperta
 †Natica brevisulcata – type locality for species
 †Natica clarkeana
 †Natica moffitti – type locality for species
 †Natica moorei
 †Natica permunda
 †Natica perspecta
 †Natica reversa
 †Natica saffordia
  Naticarius
 †Naticarius reversa
 †Naticarius semilunata
 Natrix
 †Natrix erythrogaster
 †Navajovius
 †Navajovius kohlhaasae
  Nectandra
 †Nectandra lancifolia
 †Nekrolagus
 †Nekrolagus progressus
 Nemocardium
 †Nemocardium actium
 †Nemocardium gambrinum
 †Nemocardium quihi
 †Nemodon
 †Nemodon eufaulensis
 †Neochoerus – type locality for genus
 †Neochoerus pinckneyi
 Neofiber
 †Neofiber leonardi
 Neogale
  †Neogale vison
  †Neohipparion
 †Neohipparion affine
 †Neohipparion eurystyle – type locality for species
 †Neohipparion leptode
 †Neonatrix
 †Neonatrix elongata
 †Neonatrix infera – type locality for species
 Neotamias
  †Neotamias cinereicollis
 Neotoma
 †Neotoma albigula
 †Neotoma floridana
 †Neotoma fossilis – or unidentified comparable form
 †Neotoma mexicana
  †Neotoma micropus
 †Neotoma minutus
 †Neotoma quadriplicata
 †Neozanthopsis
 †Neozanthopsis americanus
 Neptunea – report made of unidentified related form or using admittedly obsolete nomenclature
 Nerodia
 †Nerodia fasciata
 †Nerterogeomys
 †Nerterogeomys paenebursarius
 Neverita
 †Nexuotapirus
 †Nexuotapirus marslandensis
  †Nimravides
 †Nimravides hibbardi – type locality for species
 †Nimravides thinobates – or unidentified comparable form
 Niptus
 †Niptus abstrusus
 †Nonomys
 †Nonomys simplicidens
 Norrisia
 †Norrisia micromphala
 †Notharctus
  †Notharctus tenebrosus
 †Nothokemas
 †Nothokemas floridanus
 †Nothokemas hidalgensis – type locality for species
 †Nothotylopus
 †Nothotylopus camptognathus
  †Nothrotheriops
 †Nothrotheriops texanus
 †Nothrotherium
 †Nothrotherium shastense
 Notiosorex
 †Notiosorex crawfordi
 †Notiosorex jacksoni
 †Notiotitanops
 †Notiotitanops mississippiensis
 †Notolagus
 †Notolagus lepusculus
  Notophthalmus
 †Notophthalmus slaughteri – type locality for species
  Nucula
 †Nucula cochlear – type locality for species
 †Nucula magnifica
 †Nucula mauricensis
 †Nucula mediavia
 †Nucula smithvillensis
 Nuculana
 †Nuculana aldrichiana
 †Nuculana corpulentoides
 †Nuculana demissa – type locality for species
 †Nuculana eoa
 †Nuculana jewetti
 †Nuculana milamensis
 †Nuculana ovula
 †Nuculana saffordana
 †Nuculana smithvillensis – or unidentified related form
 †Nuculana travisana – or unidentified comparable form
 †Nuculana trivitate
 †Nuculana turgeo – type locality for species
 †Nudivagus
 †Nuulana
 †Nuulana turgeo – type locality for species
 Nysius – tentative report

O

 Oculina
 †Oculina singleyi – type locality for species
 Odocoileus
  †Odocoileus virginianus
  Odontaspis
 †Odontaspis exilis – type locality for species
 †Odontopolys
 †Odontopolys compsorhytis
 Odostomia
 †Odostomia ova – type locality for species
 †Odostomia trapaquara
 Ogmodontomys
 †Ogmodontomys poaphagus
 †Ogmophis
 †Ogmophis miocompactus
 Olivella
 †Olivella mediavia
 †Omomys
 †Omomys carteri
 †Omomys lloydi
  Ondatra
 †Ondatra annectens
 †Ondatra idahoensis – or unidentified comparable form
 †Ondatra zibethicus
 Onychomys
 †Onychomys gidleyi
 †Onychomys hollisteri
 †Onychomys leucogaster
 †Onychomys pedroensis
  †Onychomys torridus
 Opalia
 †Opalia cooperi – type locality for species
 Opheodrys
  †Opheodrys aestivus
 Ophisaurus
 †Oreodaphne
 †Oreodaphne obtusifolia
 †Oreodaphne perseaformis
 †Oreodaphne pseudoguianensis
 †Oromeryx
 †Orthosurcula
 †Orthosurcula adeona
 †Orthosurcula francescae
 †Orthosurcula indenta
 †Orthosurcula langdoni – or unidentified comparable form
 †Orthosurcula longipersa
 †Orthosurcula persa
 †Orthosurcula phoenicea
 Orthoyoldia
 †Orthoyoldia petropolitana
 †Orthoyoldia psammotaea
 Oryzomys
 †Oryzomys palustris
  †Osbornoceros – tentative report
 Ostrea
 †Ostrea crenulimarginata
 †Ostrea duvali
 †Ostrea frithi
 †Ostrea kochae
 †Ostrea multilirata
 †Ostrea normalis
 †Ostrea pulaskensis
 †Ostrea semmesi
 †Ostrea sinuosa
 Otionella
 †Otionella tuberosa
 †Otostomia
 †Otostomia melanella
 †Otostomia trapaquara
 †Ourayia
 †Ourayia hopsoni
 †Ourayia uintensis
 Ovis
  †Ovis canadensis
  †Oxydactylus
 †Oxydactylus benedentatus – type locality for species

P

 †Pachecoa
 †Pachecoa adamsi
 †Pachecoa concentrica – type locality for species
 †Pachecoa decisa
 †Pachecoa microcancellata
 †Pachecoa ovalis
 †Pachecoa pulchra
 †Pachecoa sabinica
 †Pachecoa smithvillensis
 †Paenemarmota
 †Paenemarmota barbouri
 †Palaechthon
 †Palaechthon woodi – or unidentified comparable form
 †Palaeictops – tentative report
 †Palaeolama
 †Palaeolama mirifica
  †Palaeophis
 †Palaeorhaphis
 †Palaeorhaphis palaeocenica – type locality for species
 †Paleoheterodon
 †Paleoheterodon tiheni
 †Paleotomus
 †Paleotomus senior
 Panopea
 Panthera
  †Panthera leo
  †Panthera onca
 †Papillina
 †Papillina dumosa
 †Paracryptotis
 †Paracryptotis rex
 Paracyathus
 †Paracyathus alternatus
 †Paracyathus bastropensis – type locality for species
 †Paraenhydrocyon
 †Paraenhydrocyon wallovianus
  †Parahippus
 †Parahippus leonensis – type locality for species
 †Parahyus
 †Parahyus vagus
 †Paralbula
 †Paralbula marylandica
 †Paramerychyus
 †Paramerychyus harrisonensis
  †Paramylodon
 †Paramylodon harlani
 †Paramys
 †Paramys delicatior – or unidentified comparable form
 †Paramys excavatus
 †Paramys leptodus
 †Paraoreomunea
 †Parapavo
 †Parapavo californicus
 †Parapotos – type locality for genus
 †Parapotos tedfordi – type locality for species
 †Paratoceras
 †Paratoceras macadamsi – type locality for species
 †Paratoceras wardi – type locality for species
 †Paratomarctus
 †Paratomarctus euthos
 †Paratomarctus temerarius
 Parbatmya – type locality for genus
 †Parbatmya brazosensis
 †Parbatmya fornicata – type locality for species
 †Parectypodus
 †Parectypodus sloani
 †Pareumys
 †Pareumys boskeyi
 †Paronychomys – tentative report
 †Parvitragulus
 †Parvitragulus priscus
 †Parvobalanus – type locality for genus
 †Parvobalanus gracilis – type locality for species
 †Patulaxis
 †Patulaxis scrobiculata
 †Pauromys
 †Pauromys simplex – type locality for species
 †Pauromys texensis
 †Pediomeryx
 †Pediomeryx hemphillensis – type locality for species
  †Peltosaurus – tentative report
 †Penetrigonias
 †Penetrigonias dakotensis
 †Peraceras
 †Peraceras hessei
 †Peraceras superciliosum
 †Peradectes – tentative report
  †Peratherium
 †Peratherium comstocki
 †Peratherium marsupium
 Periploma
 †Periploma collardi
 †Periploma howei
 †Periptychus
 †Periptychus carinidens
 Perognathus
 †Perognathus carpenteri – type locality for species
  †Perognathus flavus
 †Perognathus pearlettensis
 †Perognathus rexroadensis – or unidentified comparable form
 Peromyscus
 †Peromyscus boylii
 †Peromyscus cragini
 †Peromyscus difficilis
  †Peromyscus eremicus
 †Peromyscus gossypinus
 †Peromyscus kansasensis
  †Peromyscus leucopus
  †Peromyscus maniculatus
 †Peromyscus pectoralis
 †Peromyscus progressus – or unidentified comparable form
 †Petauristodon
 †Petauristodon jamesi
 †Petauristodon minimus – or unidentified comparable form
 Petrophyllia
 †Petrophyllia singleyi
 †Pewelagus
 †Pewelagus dawsonae
 Phacoides
 Phaedon – or unidentified comparable form
  Phalium
 †Phalium brevicostatum
 †Phalium reklawensis – type locality for species
 †Phelopteria
  †Phenacodus
 †Phenacodus bisonensis
 †Phenacodus grangeri
 †Phenacodus matthewi
 Philine
  †Phlaocyon
 †Phlaocyon annectens
 †Phlaocyon minor
  Pholadomya
 †Pholadomya harrisi
 †Pholadomya leonensis
 †Pholadomya petropolitana
 Pholas
 Phos
 †Phos sagenum
 †Phos texanum
 Phrynosoma
  †Phrynosoma cornutum
 Phyllodus
 Physa
 †Physa anatina
 †Physa gyrina
 †Physocypria
 †Physocypria pustulosa
 Pinna – tentative report
 Pisidium
 †Pisidium nitidum
  Pitar
 †Pitar angelinae
 †Pitar biboraensis
 †Pitar gazleyensis
 †Pitar hawtofi
 †Pitar juliae
 †Pitar kempae
 †Pitar nuttalliopsis
 †Pitar petropolitanus
 †Pitar pteleina
 †Pitar pteleinus
 †Pitar ripleyanus
 †Pitar texacola
 †Pitar texibrazus
 †Pitar tornadonis
 †Pitar trigoniata
 †Pitar turneri – type locality for species
 Pituophis
  †Pituophis melanoleucus
 †Plagiarca
 †Plagiarca rhomboidella
 †Plagiarca vaughani
 Plagiocardium – or unidentified comparable form
 Planorbis
 †Planorbis andersoni
 †Planorbula
 †Planorbula armigera
  †Platygonus
 †Platygonus bicalcaratus
 †Platygonus compressus
 †Platygonus pollenae
 †Platygonus vetus
 Platytrochus
 †Platytrochus primaevus – type locality for species
 †Platytrochus stokesi
 †Pleiolama
 †Pleiolama vera
 †Plesiocolopirus
 †Plesiocolopirus hancocki – or unidentified comparable form
 †Plesiogulo
 †Plesiogulo marshalli
 †Plesiolestes
 †Plesiolestes nacimienti
 †Plesiosminthus
 †Pleuofusia – tentative report
 †Pleuofusia huppertzi – type locality for species
 Pleurocera
 †Pleurocera acutum
 Pleurofusia
 †Pleurofusia huppertzi
 †Pleurofusia longirostropis
 †Pleurofusia prosseri
 †Pleurolicus
 †Pleurolicus sellardsi
 †Pleuroliria
 Pleuromeris
 †Pleuromeris leonensis
  Pleuroploca
 †Pleuroploca plummeri – or unidentified related form
  †Pleurostoma
 †Pleurostoma adolescens
  Pleurotomella
 †Pleurotomella veatchi
 †Pleurotomella whitfieldi
 Plicatula
 †Plicatula filamentosa
 †Plicatula pustula – type locality for species
 Pliciscala
 †Pliciscala albitesta
 †Plinthicus
  †Pliohippus
 †Pliohippus fossulatus
 †Pliohippus nobilis
 †Pliohippus pernix
 †Pliohippus spectans – tentative report
 †Pliometanastes
 †Pliometanastes protistus – or unidentified comparable form
 †Pliosaccomys
 †Pliosaccomys higginsensis
 †Pliotaxidea
 †Pliotaxidea nevadensis – or unidentified comparable form
 †Plotophysops – tentative report
 †Plotophysops angularis – type locality for species
 †Poabromylus
 †Poabromylus kayi
 Podomys
 †Podomys oklahomensis
  †Poebrotherium
 †Poebrotherium chadronense – type locality for species
 †Poebrotherium franki – type locality for species
 †Polidevcia
 †Polidevcia magna
  Polinices
 †Polinices aratus
 †Polinices eminulus
 †Polinices harrisii
 †Polinices julianna
 †Polinices onustus – type locality for species
 Polydora
  Polygyra
 †Polygyra texasiana
 Polymorphina
 †Polymorphina gibba
 †Polymorphina regularis
 Polyschides
 †Polyschides margarita
  Porites
 †Porites douvillei
 Poromya – or unidentified related form
 †Postalia
 †Postalia americana – type locality for species
  †Potamides
 †Potamides matsoni
 †Pratilepus
 †Pratilepus kansasensis
 †Preophidion – type locality for genus
 †Preophidion petropolis
 †Preophidion stintoni – type locality for species
 Prionocidaris
 †Prionocidaris cojimarensis
 †Priscocamelus
 †Priscocamelus wilsoni
 †Priscoficus
 †Priscoficus juvenis
 †Pristichampsus
  Pristis
 †Probassariscus
 †Problastomeryx
 †Problastomeryx primus
  †Procamelus
 †Procamelus grandis
 †Procamelus leptognathus
 †Procamelus occidentalis
 †Procastoroides
 †Procastoroides sweeti
 †Procynodictis
 †Procynodictis vulpiceps – or unidentified comparable form
 Procyon
  †Procyon lotor
 †Procyon rexroadensis
 †Prodipodomys
 †Prodipodomys centralis
 †Progeomys
 †Progeomys sulcatus – type locality for species
 †Prohesperocyon
 †Prohesperocyon wilsoni
 †Proheteromys
 †Proheteromys sabinensis – type locality for species
 †Proheteromys toledoensis – type locality for species
 †Prolapsus
 †Prolapsus junctionis – type locality for species
 †Prolapsus sibilatoris – type locality for species
 †Promathildia
 †Promathildia parvilis – or unidentified comparable form
 †Promathildia parvula – or unidentified comparable form
 Promenetus
 †Promenetus exacuous
 †Promioclaenus
 †Promioclaenus acolytus
 †Proneofiber
 †Proneofiber guildayi – type locality for species
  Propeamussium
 †Propeamussium alabamense
 †Prosigmodon
 †Prosimnia
 †Prosimnia naviculae
 †Prosthennops
 †Prosthennops serus
 †Prosthennops xiphodonticus
 †Prosynthetoceras
 †Prosynthetoceras francisi – type locality for species
 †Prosynthetoceras orthrionanus – type locality for species
 †Prosynthetoceras texanus – type locality for species
 †Proterixoides
 †Prothryptacodon
 †Protictis
  †Protitanotherium
 †Protitanotherium emarginatum
  †Protoceras – tentative report
 †Protocitta
 †Protocitta ajax – type locality for species
  †Protohippus
 †Protohippus gidleyi
 †Protohippus perditus
 †Protohippus supremus – type locality for species
 †Protohippus vetus
 †Protolabis
 †Protolabis coartatus
 †Protoreodon
 †Protoreodon parvus
 †Protoreodon petersoni
 †Protoreodon pumilus
 †Protosciurus
 †Protoscutella
 †Protoscutella mississippiensis
 †Protoselene – or unidentified comparable form
 †Protospermophilus
 †Protospermophilus quatalensis
 †Protosurcula
 †Protosurcula aurora – type locality for species
 †Protosurcula gabbii
 †Protosurcula tenuirostris
  †Protylopus – tentative report
 Pseudacris
 †Pseudacris clarki
  †Pseudacris ocularis
  †Pseudacris streckeri
  †Pseudaelurus – tentative report
  †Pseudhipparion
 †Pseudhipparion curtivallum
 †Pseudhipparion hessei – type locality for species
 †Pseudhipparion skinneri
 †Pseudoceras
 †Pseudoceras skinneri
  Pseudochama
 †Pseudocylindrodon
 †Pseudocylindrodon neglectus
 †Pseudocylindrodon pintoensis – or unidentified related form
 †Pseudocylindrodon texanus – type locality for species
 Pseudoliva
 †Pseudoliva ostrarupis
 †Pseudoliva santander
 †Pseudoliva scalina
 †Pseudoliva vetusta
 Pseudomalaxis
 †Pseudomalaxis acuta – type locality for species
 †Pseudomalaxis plummerae
 †Pseudomalaxis reklawensis – type locality for species
 †Pseudomalaxis texana
 †Pseudometula – type locality for genus
 †Pseudometula gradus – type locality for species
 †Pseudoparablastomeryx
 †Pseudoparablastomeryx scotti
  †Pseudoprotoceras
 †Pseudoprotoceras minor
 †Pseudotheridomys
 †Pseudotomus
 †Pseudotomus johanniculi
 †Pseudotomus petersoni – or unidentified comparable form
  †Psittacotherium
 †Psittacotherium multifragum
 Pteria
 †Pteria deusseni
 †Pteria limula
 †Pteria petropolitana
 Pteris
 †Pteris dentata
 †Pteropsella
 †Pteropsella lapidosa
 †Pteropsella praelapidosa
 †Pterosphenus
 †Pterosphenus schucherti
  Pterothrissus
 †Pterothrissus truncatus
  Pterynotus
 †Pterynotus sabinola
 †Pterynotus stenzeli – type locality for species
  †Ptilodus
 †Ptilodus mediaevus
 Ptinus
 Puma
 †Puma concolor
 Pupilla
 †Pupilla blandi
 Pupoides
 †Pupoides albilabris
 Pycnodonte
 †Pycnodonte sylvaerupis
 †Pylodictis
  †Pylodictis olivaris
 Pyramidella
 †Pyramidella bastropensis
 †Pyramidella dalli
 †Pyramidella filamentosa – type locality for species
 †Pyramidella perexilis
 †Pyramidella pirum – type locality for species
 †Pyramidella propeacicula
 †Pyramidella pseudopymaea
 †Pyramidella tundrae – type locality for species
 †Pyramimitra
 †Pyramimitra eocenica – type locality for species
 †Pyramimitra terebraeformis
 †Pyricythereis
 †Pyricythereis alabamensis
 †Pyricythereis delicata – type locality for species
 †Pyricythereis foveovalva – type locality for species
 †Pyricythereis seminuda – type locality for species
 †Pyricythereis smithvillensis – type locality for species
 †Pyricythereis subtriangularis – type locality for species

Q

 †Quadratomus
 †Quadratomus gigans
  †Quadrula
 †Quadrula frustulosa
 †Quadrula speciosa
 Quinqueloculina
 †Quinqueloculina claiborniana
 †Quinqueloculina seminulum
 †Quinqueloculina vulgaris

R

 Raja
  †Raja texana – type locality for species
  †Rana
 †Rana catesbiana – lapsus calami of Rana catesbeiana
 †Rana pipiens
 Ranularia
 †Ranularia hula
  Raphitoma
 †Raphitoma bastropensis – type locality for species
 †Raphitoma bellula
 †Raphitoma fannae
 †Raphitoma georgei – type locality for species
 †Raphitoma iuventae – type locality for species
 †Raphitoma rebecella
 †Raphitoma sabinia
 †Raphitoma specus
 Reithrodontomys
 †Reithrodontomys fulvescens
 †Reithrodontomys megalotis
 †Reithrodontomys montanus
 †Reithrodontomys moorei
 †Reithrodontomys rexroadensis – or unidentified comparable form
 †Retinella
 †Retinella indentata
  Retusa
 †Retusa adamsi
 †Retusa adamski – or unidentified comparable form
 †Retusa emoryi
 †Retusa galba
 †Retusa jacksonensis
 †Retusa kellogii
 †Retusa notata – type locality for species
 †Retusa sylvaerupis
 †Rhabdopitaria
 †Rhabdopitaria astartoides
 †Rhabdopitaria pricei
 †Rhabdopitaria texangelina
 Rhinobatos
 Rhinocheilus
  †Rhinocheilus lecontei
 Rhinoptera
 Rhizorus
 †Rhizorus conradianus
 †Rhizorus loisae
 †Rhizorus minutissimus
 †Rhizorus smithvillensis
 †Rhizorus volutatus
  †Rhynchotherium – tentative report
 Rimella
 †Rimella laqueatus
 †Rimella texanum
 Ringicula
 †Ringicula alabamensis
 †Ringicula butleriana – tentative report
 †Ringicula dubia
 †Ringicula trapaquara
 †Rooneyia – type locality for genus
 †Rooneyia viejaensis – type locality for species
 †Rotalia
 †Rotalia beccarii
 †Rotularia
 †Rudiscala

S

 Saccella
 †Saccella atakta
 Salvadora
 †Salvadora paleolineata
 †Sapindus
 †Sapindus linearifolius
  Sassia
 †Sassia nucleoides – type locality for species
 †Sassia septemdentata
 †Sassia septendentata
 †Saxolucina
 †Saxolucina claytonia
 Scalina
 †Scalina dolosa
 †Scalina trapaquara
 Scalopus
  †Scalopus aquaticus
  Scaphander
 Scaphella
 †Scaphella newcombiana
 †Scaphella showalteri
  Scaphiopus
 †Scaphites
 Sceloporus
 †Sceloporus olivaceus
 †Sceloporus undulatus
 †Scenopagus
 †Scenopagus edenensis – or unidentified comparable form
 †Schedocardia
 †Schedocardia hatchetigbeensis
 †Schizorthosecos
 †Schizorthosecos interstitia
 Sciurus
  †Sciurus carolinensis
 †Sciurus niger
 Scobinella
 †Scobinella reticulatoides
 †Selaginella
 Selenophorus – or unidentified comparable form
 Semele
 †Semele australina
 †Semiactaeon
 †Semiactaeon texanum – type locality for species
 †Septastrea
 †Septastrea kerioides – type locality for species
 Serpulorbis
 †Serpulorbis gonioides
 †Serpulorbis multiclavus – type locality for species
 Sigatica
 †Sigatica harrisi
 Sigmodon
 †Sigmodon curtisi – or unidentified comparable form
  †Sigmodon hispidus
 †Sigmodon hudspethensis – type locality for species
 †Sigmodon minor
 †Signata – type locality for genus
 †Signata nicoli – type locality for species
 †Signata stenzeli – type locality for species
 Siliqua
 †Siliqua simondsi
 †Simidectes
 †Simidectes magnus
 †Similisciurus
 †Similisciurus maxwelli – type locality for species
 †Simimys – or unidentified comparable form
  Simnia
 †Simnia texana
 Sincola
 †Sincola galvestonensis
 Sinodia
 †Sinodia eocaenica
  †Sinopa
 †Sinopa major
  Sinum
 †Sinum arctatum
 †Sinum bilix
 †Sinum declive
 †Sinum fiski – type locality for species
 †Sinum inconstans
 †Sinum moveum – type locality for species
 †Sinum taylori – type locality for species
  Siphonalia
 †Siphonalia newtonensis
 †Siphonalia plummeri
  Siren
 †Siren miotexana – type locality for species
 †Skaptotion
 †Skaptotion reklawensis – type locality for species
 Skena
 †Skena pignus
 Skenea
 †Skenea dalli
  †Smilodon
 †Smilodon fatalis
 †Soergelia
  †Soergelia mayfieldi
 Solariella
 †Solariella aldrichiana
 †Solariella tricostata
 Solariorbis
 †Solariorbis conicus – type locality for species
 †Solariorbis discoides – type locality for species
 †Solariorbis parsnaticoide – type locality for species
 †Solariorbis parsnaticoides – type locality for species
 †Solariorbis proius
 †Solariorbis velarum – type locality for species
 †Solastella – type locality for genus
 †Solastella cookei – type locality for species
 Solemya
 †Solemya bilix
 Solen
 †Solen pendletonensis
 Solena
 †Solena shirleyi – type locality for species
 †Sophora
 †Sophora wilcoxiana
 Sorex
 †Sorex cinereus
 †Sorex cudahyensis
 †Sorex lacustris
 †Sorex megapalustris
  †Sorex palustris
 †Sorex pratensis
 †Sorex taylori
 †Sorex vagrans
 Spermophilus
 †Spermophilus elegans – or unidentified comparable form
 †Spermophilus finlayensis
 †Spermophilus howelli – or unidentified comparable form
 †Spermophilus mcgheei
  †Spermophilus spilosoma
  †Spermophilus tridecemlineatus
 †Spermophilus variegatus
 Sphaerium
 †Sphaerium striatinum
 †Sphyreana
 Spilogale
 †Spilogale microdens
 †Spilogale putorius
 †Spilogale rexroadi
 †Spinizoncolpites
 †Spinizoncolpites prominatus
 Spirorbis
 †Spirorbis leptostoma
 Spirotropis
 †Spirotropis claibornica – type locality for species
  Spisula
 †Spisula parilis
 Sportella – tentative report
 †Sportella divaricata
  Stagnicola
 †Stagnicola bulimoides
 †Stagnicola exilis
 †Stagnicola reflexa
  †Stegomastodon
 †Stegomastodon mirificus
 †Steneofiber
 †Steneofiber barbouri – or unidentified comparable form
 †Steneofiber fossor
 †Steneofiber hesperus
  †Stenomylus
 †Stenotrema
 †Stenotrema leai
 †Stenotrema monodon
 Sternotherus
 Sthenictis
 †Stintonia
 †Stintonia brazosia
  †Stockoceros – or unidentified comparable form
 Storeria
 †Storeria dekayi
 †Strepsidura
 †Strepsidura contorea
 †Strepsidura ficus
 †Strepsidura harrisi – type locality for species
 Striarca
 †Striarca stearnsii
 †Striarca webbervillensis
 †Striatolamia
 †Striatolamia macrota
 Strobilops
 †Strobilops texasiana
 †Stygimys
 †Stygimys vastus – type locality for species
  †Stylinodon
 Succinea
 †Succinea avara
 †Sulcocypraea
 †Sulcocypraea kennedyi
 Surculites
 †Surculites cabezai
 †Surculites lapillus – type locality for species
 †Surculoma
 †Surculoma dumblei
 †Surculoma falsabenes
 †Surculoma imbricata – type locality for species
 †Surculoma kellogii
 †Surculoma leoncola
 †Surculoma penrosei
 †Sycostoma
 †Sycostoma texana – type locality for species
 Sylvilagus
 †Sylvilagus audubonii
 †Sylvilagus floridanus
 †Sylvilagus hibbardi
 †Symmetrodontomys
 †Symmetrodontomys beckensis
 †Symmetrodontomys simplicidens
 †Symplocos
 †Symplocos amoena – type locality for species
 †Symplocos fritschii – type locality for species
 †Symplocos martinettoi – type locality for species
 †Symplocos platycarpa – type locality for species
 †Symplocos rothwelii – type locality for species
 †Symplocos trinitiensis – type locality for species
 †Symplocos trisulcata – type locality for species
 Synaptomys
 †Synaptomys australis – or unidentified comparable form
 †Synaptomys cooperi
 †Syncyclonema
  †Synthetoceras
 †Synthetoceras tricornatus – type locality for species
 Syrphus – or unidentified comparable form
 Syrrhophus
 †Syrrhophus marnocki

T

  Tantilla
 Tanytarsus – tentative report
  Tapirus
 †Tapirus haysii
 †Tapirus veroensis
 Taxidea
 †Taxidea taxus
 Teinostoma
 †Teinostoma barryi – type locality for species
 †Teinostoma eoa
 †Teinostoma texanum
  †Teleoceras
 †Teleoceras fossiger
 †Teleoceras guymonense
 †Teleoceras hicksi
 †Teleoceras major
 †Teleoceras medicornutum
 †Teleoceras meridianum
  Tellina
 †Tellina cherokeensis
 †Tellina leana
 †Tellina makelloides
 †Tellina petropolitana
 †Tellina quihi
 †Tellina santander
 †Tellina semipapyra – or unidentified comparable form
 †Tellina semipapyria
 †Tellina tallicheti
 †Tellina trumani
  Tenagodus
 †Tenagodus texanus
 †Tenuimactra – type locality for genus
 †Tenuimactra hodgkinsoni – type locality for species
 †Tephrocyon
 †Tephrocyon scitulus
 Terebellum
  Terebra
 †Terebra texagyra
 †Terebrifusus
 †Terebrifusus amoenus
 †Terebrifusus multiplicatus
 Teredo
 †Teredo maverickensis
 †Teredo ringens
 Terminalia
 †Terminalia hilgardiana
 †Ternstroemites
 †Ternstroemites preclaibornensis
 Terrapene
 †Terrapene carolina
  †Terrapene ornata
 Testudo
  †Tetrameryx
 †Tetrameryx knoxensis
 †Tetrameryx shuleri
 †Texasophis – type locality for genus
 †Texasophis fossilis – type locality for species
 †Texmelanatria
 †Texmelanatria angeloi
 †Texmelanatria texana
 †Texoceros
 †Texoceros altidens – type locality for species
 †Texodon
 †Texodon meridianus – type locality for species
 †Texomys
 †Texomys ritchiei – type locality for species
 Thamnophis
 †Thamnophis proximus
 †Thamnophis sauritus
 †Thamnophis sirtalis
 Theodoxus
 †Theodoxus domicilium – type locality for species
  †Thinobadistes
 †Thinobadistes wetzeli
 †Thisbemys
 †Thisbemys corrugatus
 Thomomys
 †Thomomys bottae
 †Thomomys talpoides – or unidentified comparable form
 †Tibiella – report made of unidentified related form or using admittedly obsolete nomenclature
 †Tibiella texana
 †Tiburnus
 †Tiburnus texanus
  †Ticholeptus
 †Ticholeptus rileyi – type locality for species
  †Titanoides
 †Titanoides gidleyi – or unidentified comparable form
 †Tomarctus
 †Tomarctus brevirostris
 †Tornatellaea
 †Tornatellaea leai
 †Tornatellaea quercollis – tentative report
 †Tornatellaea texana
 †Tornatina – report made of unidentified related form or using admittedly obsolete nomenclature
 †Tornatina angelinae
 †Toromeryx
 †Toromeryx marginensis – type locality for species
 †Toxotherium
 †Toxotherium hunteri
 †Transovula
 †Transovula scobina – type locality for species
 †Trichiuris
  †Trigonias – tentative report
 †Trigonictis
 †Trigonictis cookii
  Trigonostoma
 †Trigonostoma babylonicum
 †Trigonostoma elegantissima – type locality for species
 †Trigonostoma gemmatum
 †Trigonostoma harrisi
 †Trigonostoma herbae – type locality for species
 †Trigonostoma jonesae – type locality for species
 †Trigonostoma panones
 †Trigonostoma penrosei
 †Trigonostoma sabinetownense
 †Trigonostoma sabinetownensis – type locality for species
 Trigonulina
 †Trigonulina satex
 †Trimalaxis – type locality for genus
 †Trimalaxis ora – type locality for species
 †Trinacria
 †Trinacria microcancellata – type locality for species
 †Tripia
 †Tripia anteatripla – tentative report
 †Triplopus – tentative report
 †Triplopus implicatus – or unidentified comparable form
 Trochita
 †Trochita aperta
 Trochocyathus
 †Trochocyathus coloradoensis – type locality for species
 †Trochocyathus uber – type locality for species
  Tropidoclonion
 †Tropidoclonion lineatum
 †Tropisurcula
 †Tropisurcula crenula – tentative report
 †Tropisurcula grandis – type locality for species
 †Tropisurcula milamensis – type locality for species
 †Tropisurcula planus – type locality for species
 †Truncilla
  †Truncilla truncata
 †Trygon
 †Trygon alveolatus – type locality for species
 †Trypanotoma
 †Trypanotoma longispira
 †Trypanotoma terebriformis
 †Trypanotopsis
 †Trypanotopsis texana
 †Tuba
 †Tuba antiquata
 Tubiola
 †Tubiola gracilis – type locality for species
  Tucetona
 †Tucetona sabinensis
 †Turbinolia
 †Turbinolia pharetra
 †Turbinolia subtercisa – type locality for species
 †Turbinolia tenuis
 Turboella
  Turbonilla
 †Turbonilla clinensis
 †Turbonilla meta – type locality for species
 †Turbonilla neglecta – type locality for species
 Turpinia
 †Turpinia tiffneyi – type locality for species
 Turricula
 †Turricula floweri
 †Turricula nasuta
 †Turricula plenta
  Turris
 †Turris bimaniofus – or unidentified comparable form
 †Turris capax
 †Turris mediavia
 †Turris nadoideus
 †Turris nasuta – or unidentified comparable form
 †Turris rockscreekensis
 †Turris specus
  Turritella
 †Turritella – type locality for species informal
 †Turritella bellifera
 †Turritella biplicata – or unidentified comparable form
 †Turritella chirena
 †Turritella cortezi
 †Turritella dutexata
 †Turritella eurynome
 †Turritella femina
 †Turritella hilli
 †Turritella houstonia
 †Turritella humerosa
 †Turritella kincaidensis
 †Turritella nasuta
 †Turritella nerinexa
 †Turritella ola
 †Turritella plummeri
 †Turritella polysticha
 †Turritella prehumerosa
 †Turritella premortoni
 †Turritella turneri
 †Tylotrochus
  Tympanuchus
 Typhina
 †Typhina palmerae
 †Typodus
 †Typodus thyroidea
 Tyto
 †Tyto alba

U

  †Uintatherium – or unidentified comparable form
 †Uintatherium anceps
 Umbraculum
 †Umbraculum planulatum
 †Umbraculum tomaculum – type locality for species
 Unio
 Urocyon
  †Urocyon cinereoargenteus – or unidentified comparable form
 †Urocyon galushai
 Uromitra
 †Uromitra brazosana
 Ursus
 †Ursus americanus
 †Ustatochoerus
 †Ustatochoerus leptoscelos
 †Ustatochoerus major

V

  Vallonia
 †Vallonia gracilicosta
 †Vallonia parvula
 †Varicobela
 †Varicobela filum – type locality for species
 Venericardia
 †Venericardia bashiplata
 †Venericardia densata – type locality for species
 †Venericardia dua
 †Venericardia eoa
 †Venericardia horatiana
 †Venericardia jewelli
 †Venericardia mediaplata
 †Venericardia planicosta
 †Venericardia rotunda
 †Venericardia smithi
 †Venericardia smithii
 †Venericardia stewarti
 †Venericardia texalana
 Verticordia
 †Verticordia satex – or unidentified comparable form
 Vertigo
  †Vertigo ovata
 †Vetericardiella
 †Vetericardiella webbervillensis
 Vibracellina
 †Vibracellina capillaria
 †Viejadjidaumo
 †Viejadjidaumo magniscopuli – type locality for species
 †Viridomys
 †Vokesula
 †Vokesula aldrichi
 †Vokesula smithvillensis
 †Volutostrombus – type locality for genus
 †Volutostrombus eocenica – type locality for species
 †Volvaria
 †Volvaria gabbiana
 †Volvaria reticulata
 †Volvariella
 †Volvariella milamensis – type locality for species
 Volvulella
 †Volvulella reklawensis – type locality for species
 Vulpes
 †Vulpes stenognathus
  †Vulpes velox
  †Vulpes vulpes

X

 †Xenochelys
  †Xenocyon
 †Xenocyon texanus
 Xenophora

Y

 Yoldia
 †Yoldia houstonia
 †Yoldia kindlei
 †Yoldia praecompsa
 Yua
 †Yua texana – type locality for species
 †Yumaceras
 †Yumaceras figginsi – or unidentified comparable form

Z

 †Zanthopsis
 †Zanthopsis peytoni
 †Zanycteris – tentative report
 Zonitoides
  †Zonitoides arboreus

References

 

Texas
Cenozoic
Texas-related lists